Ken Turner (30 June 1935 – 11 February 2022) was a former Australian rules footballer who played with Collingwood in the VFL. He is the father of Australian Rules footballer Jamie Turner, who also played with Collingwood. He was a cousin of former test cricketer Graham Yallop, nephew of Stan Yates and was a cousin of murdered lawyer Keith William Allan.

Turner usually played on either the half forward flank or as a wingman. He was a member of Collingwood's premiership side in 1958 and represented Victoria at interstate football seven times during his career.

See also
 Australian football at the 1956 Summer Olympics

References

External links

1935 births
2022 deaths
Collingwood Football Club players
Collingwood Football Club Premiership players
Australian footballers at the 1956 Summer Olympics
Australian rules footballers from Victoria (Australia)
Place of birth missing
One-time VFL/AFL Premiership players